Listed below are the dates and results for the 1986 FIFA World Cup qualification rounds for the Asian zone (AFC). For an overview of the qualification rounds, see the article 1986 FIFA World Cup qualification.

A total of 28 AFC teams entered the competition. However, Chinese Taipei were assigned to the Oceanian zone instead. The Asian zone was allocated 2 places (out of 24) in the final tournament. Asia's automatic qualifying berths were taken by Iraq and Korea Republic.

Tournament structure

The 27 teams were divided into 2 zones, based on geographical considerations. Zone A had 13 teams (teams from West Asia) and Zone B had 14 teams (teams from East Asia). There would be three rounds of play in each zone:

First Round: The teams were divided into 4 groups of 3 or 4 teams each. The teams played against each other on a home-and-away basis. The group winners would advance to the Second Round.
Second Round: The 4 teams in each zone were paired up to play knockout matches on a home-and-away basis. The winners would advance to the Final Round.
Final Round: The 2 teams in each zone played against each other on a home-and-away basis. The winners would qualify for the 1986 FIFA World Cup.

Due to wars their countries were involved in, Iran, Iraq and Lebanon had to play all their home matches on neutral ground or away.

AFC Zone A (West)

First round

Group 1A

Group 1B

Group 2A

Group 2B

Second round

|}

First leg

Second leg

4–4 on aggregate, Iraq advanced to the Zone A Final Round on away goals.

Syria advanced to the Zone A Final Round.

Final round

|}

First leg

Second leg

Iraq won 3–1 on aggregate and qualified for the 1986 FIFA World Cup.

AFC Zone B (East)

First round

Group 3A

Group 3B

Group 4A

Group 4B

Second round

|}

First leg

Second leg

Korea Republic won 6–1 on aggregate and advanced to the Zone B Final Round.

Japan won 5–1 on aggregate and advanced to the Zone B Final Round.

Final round

|}

First leg

Second leg

Korea Republic won 3–1 on aggregate and qualified for the 1986 World Cup

Qualified teams
The following two teams from AFC qualified for the final tournament.

1 Bold indicates champions for that year. Italic indicates hosts for that year.

Goalscorers

7 goals

 Lau Wing Yip

6 goals

 Zhao Dayu

5 goals

 Kazushi Kimura

4 goals

 Liu Haiguang
 Mak King-Fun
 Bambang Nurdiansyah
 Dede Sulaiman
 Hussein Saeed
 Hiromi Hara
 Huh Jung-Moo

3 goals

 Li Hui
 Zuo Shusheng
 Wan Chi Keung
 Ahmed Radhi
 Takashi Mizunuma
 Akihiro Nishimura
 Salah Al-Hasawi
 Zainal Abidin Hassan

2 goals

 Ibrahim Al-Hardan
 Ibrahim Farhan
 Ashrafuddin Chunnu
 Yang Zhaohui
 Lai Wing-Cheung
 Krishanu Dey
 Bikash Panji
 Khalil Allawi
 Abdul-Aziz Al-Anbari
 Faisal Al-Dakhil
 Alberto Carvalhal
 Dollah Salleh
 Mansoor Muftah
 Byun Byung-Joo
 Kim Joo-Sung
 Lee Tae-Ho
 Mahmoud Al-Sayed
 Walid Abu Al-Sel
 Adnan Al-Talyani
 Fahad Khamees

1 goal

 Rahman Hisham Abdullah
 Yousif Al-Sobaei
 Adnan Ali Deif
 Ebrahim Isa
 Ashish Bhadra
 Kaiser Hamid
 Elias Hossein
 Zainudin Kassim
 Ahmed Rahim
 Jia Xiuquan
 Lin Lefeng
 Lin Qiang
 Wang Huiliang
 Cheung Chi Tak
 Cheung Ka-Ping
 Ku Kam Fai
 Sze Wai-Shan
 Camilo Gonsalves
 Sisir Ghosh
 Narender Thapa
 Herry Kiswanto
 Karim Allawi
 Shaker Mahmoud
 Haris Mohammed
 Wamidh Munir
 Karim Saddam
 Koichi Hashiratani
 Hisashi Kato
 Jamal Abu Abed
 Rateb Al-Dawud
 Issam Said Saleh
 Jamal Yaqoub
 Meng Kam Jong
 Daniel Pinto
 Yunus Alif
 Han Hyong-Il
 Song Chul Yu
 Yung Jong-Sung
 Abdulnaser Abbas
 Mohammed Khalifa Al-Ammari
 Ahmed Issa Al-Mohannadi
 Ali Mohammed Al-Saadah
 Adel Malulla
 Au-Yeong Pak Kuan
 Yahya Madon
 Cho Min-Kook
 Choi Soon-Ho
 Chung Jong-Soo
 Jung Yong-Hwan
 Kim Suk-Won
 Park Chang-Sun
 Abubakar Al-Mass
 Adnan Ahmed Al-Sabbou
 Tariq Abdullah Kassim
 Wagdan Mahmoud Shadli
 Radwan Al-Shaikh
 Abdul Kader Kardaghli
 Nizar Mahrous
 Marwan Medrati
 Thanis Areesa-ngarkul
 Narasak Boonkleang
 Vithoon Kijmongkolsak
 Sakdarin Thongmee

1 own goal

 Ng Chi Kit (playing against China)
 Rupak Ray Sharma (playing against South Korea)

See also
China v Hong Kong (1985)
1986 FIFA World Cup qualification (UEFA)
1986 FIFA World Cup qualification (CONMEBOL)
1986 FIFA World Cup qualification (CONCACAF)
1986 FIFA World Cup qualification (CAF)
1986 FIFA World Cup qualification (OFC)

External links
 FIFA.com Reports
 RSSSF Page
 Results and scorers

 
AFC
FIFA World Cup qualification (AFC)
Football World Cup